Saré Coly Sallé is an arrondissement of Vélingara in Thiès Region in Senegal.

References 

Arrondissements of Senegal